57th Street or 57th Street station may refer to:
57th Street (Manhattan)
57th Street station (IND Sixth Avenue Line)
57th Street station (IRT Second Avenue Line) (demolished)

See also
55th–56th–57th Street station, a Metra/NICTD stop in Chicago
57th Street–Seventh Avenue station, a New York City subway station